Barningham may refer to:

Barningham, County Durham
Barningham, Suffolk
Little Barningham, Norfolk
North Barningham, Norfolk